is a Japanese former baseball pitcher. Mitsuhiro played with the Hankyu Braves from 1959 to 1979. He won the Nippon Professional Baseball Most Valuable Player Award in the Pacific League in 1967.

External links
Baseball-Reference

Japanese baseball players
Hankyu Braves players
1940 births
Living people
Nippon Professional Baseball MVP Award winners